Attorney General Gray may refer to:

John Hamilton Gray (New Brunswick politician) (1814–1889), Attorney General of the Province of New Brunswick
George Gray (senator) (1840–1925), Attorney General of Delaware
Reginald Gray (barrister) (1851–1935), Attorney-General of Bermuda
Samuel Brownlow Gray (1823–1910), Attorney-General of the Bermudas
Frederick Thomas Gray (1918–1992), Attorney General of Virginia
Robert Isaac Dey Gray (1772–1804), Acting Attorney General of Upper Canada

See also
General Gray (disambiguation)